is a 2002 action video game developed by Genki exclusively for the Xbox gaming console. The game is published by Microsoft Game Studios in Japan and Majesco Entertainment in North America. Maximum Chase plays similarly to that of the Project Gotham Racing series, and features around 20 licensed car brands, including Chevrolet, Lexus, Nissan, and Pontiac. Licensed cars are also included, with the Corvette and Firebird being some of the highlights.

Plot
Levels take place entirely within a car and are split into driving and shooting sections while controlling the main character, Rick Summer, who is voiced by actor Chris Hatfield.

Cast
Rick Summer – voiced by Chris Hatfield
Catherine Stanfield – voiced by Jennifer Aquino
Coleman – voiced by Dan Gilvezan

Reception

Maximum Chase received "mixed" reviews according to the review aggregation website Metacritic. In Japan, however, Famitsu gave it a score of 30 out of 40.

Brad Shoemaker, reviewing the game for GameSpot, said it was a nice diversion for a few hours but criticized the lack of replay value, technical bugs, and the fact the game had an MSRP of full retail price, calling it "nearly a crime".

References

External links

2002 video games
Action video games
Genki (company) games
Majesco Entertainment games
Microsoft games
Racing video games
Video games about police officers
Video games developed in Japan
Video games scored by Yasuharu Takanashi
Video games set in Los Angeles
Video games set in the United States
Xbox games
Xbox-only games